Calvin James Bridges (born January 24, 1952) is an American gospel musician. He started his music career, in 1988, with the release of, Renew My Spirit, by Word Records, and this was his breakthrough release upon the Billboard Gospel Albums chart. His subsequent album, Awesome, was released by A&M Records, which was his second and last album to chart on the aforementioned chart. He released five more albums, but they did not chart.

Early life
Bridges was born on January 24, 1952, as Calvin James Bridges.

Music career
His music recording career commenced in 1988, with the album, Renew My Spirit, and it was released by Word Records in 1988. This release coincidentally was his breakthrough album upon the Billboard Gospel Albums chart, placing at a peak of No. 12. The subsequent album, Awesome, was released in 1990 by A&M Records, and this placed at a peak of No. 26 on the aforementioned chart.

Discography

References

External links
 Official website

1952 births
Living people
African-American musicians
African-American Christians
Word Records artists
Musicians from Chicago
21st-century African-American people
20th-century African-American people